is a Japanese badminton player. He is known to have a skillful and relentless play style on court. He has won several major badminton tournaments including two World Championships titles, two Asian Championships titles, and one All England title. Momota entered into Guinness Book of World Records for "The most badminton men's singles titles in a season", for his achievements by winning 11 titles in the 2019 season.

Career 
Kento Momota started his badminton career from junior level with quite perfect results. Momota's badminton talent has been seen since he was a child. The player born in Mitoyo, Kagawa Prefecture, on 1 September 1994, started to wrestle with feathers since he was in the second grade of elementary school. He won the first title in a fairly prestigious tournament in Japan, the All Japan Elementary School Championships. Kala's Momota, who was in grade 6, came out as a champion in the men's singles number. After elementary school, Momota continued his studies in Junior High School in Fukushima Prefecture. In his third year, he again won a similar tournament but at the junior level, the All Japan Junior High School Championships. Graduating from junior high school, Momota studied at Tomioka High School in Fukushima prefecture to hone his skills in badminton.

2011 
Momota's presence was increasingly visible as he took part in a bigger race, the 2011 World Junior Championships held in Taipei, Taiwan. Even though Momota did not make it as a champion, it was a valuable lesson when he lost in the semifinal to the Malaysian Zulfadli Zulkiffli who came out as the 2011 World Junior Champion. Towards the end of 2011, Momota began to compete with his seniors in the All Japan Badminton Championship or 2011 Japan National Championship. Momota lost to Kenichi Tago in the final. Even so, his performance was noticed by the Nippon Badminton Association (NBA). Momota began to join the Japanese national team and was expected to become a future star.

2012 
Young Momota continued to learn from his defeats. Momota participated in the 2012 Asian Junior Championships held in Gimcheon, South Korea. Learning from his mistakes in 2011, he avenged his defeat in 2011 by becoming 2012 Asia Junior Champion after defeating Malaysian representatives, Soong Joo Ven in two straight games, 21–13, 22–20. In the same year, Momota also won the World Junior Championships held in Chiba, Japan. Appearing at home, Momota managed to donate gold in public. In the final round, he beat the mainstay of China, Xue Song through a very tight rubber game match. Momota won 21–17, 19–21, 21–19.

2013 
The promising Momota prospect attracted the attention of the Nippon Telegraph and Telephone East Corporation (NTT East), the badminton club of NTT East which finally succeeded in asking for his hand to join. Momota officially joined the club that raised its name since April 2013. NTT East is the largest telecommunications company in Japan. By joining the NTT East club, Momota was ready with the consequences of also working at the company. Momota who was then 19 years old had begun to learn to manage time management in such a way. He began to get used to dividing his time to work, practicing on the Japanese national team, and being active in his club.

In 2013, Momota who started the youth competition was sent to the International Challenge competition level. Satisfactory results in the International Challenge tournaments in Europe. Momota managed to emerge as champion in Estonia, Sweden and Austria. Momota was immediately forged in a series of Grand Prix/Gold tournaments and even Superseries (Premiers) throughout 2013.

2014 
He won all his matches during Japan's maiden Thomas Cup victory in 2014, playing second men's singles behind Kenichi Tago.

2015 
In 2015, he became the first Japanese player to win the Singapore Open. By winning that title, he became the first Japanese player to successfully capture a Superseries in the men's singles and currently holds the record as the youngest Superseries champion in that category. In the 2015 Sudirman Cup, he repeated his feat in Thomas Cup to help Japan secure a spot as a runner-up. He once again made history in the 2015  BWF World Championships held in Jakarta. He became the first Japanese player to win a medal in the men's singles of the prestigious tournament. He made it to the semi-finals, before losing to Chen Long in straight sets. Rounding off the year, he won the 2015 BWF World Superseries Finals in Dubai. He competed at the 2014 Asian Games in Incheon, South Korea, as well as the 2016 Badminton Asia Team Championships in Hyderabad, India.

2018 
Momota returned to the Japanese national team at the end of 2017. However, due to a lack of his points, he was not qualified to play in the 2018 All England Open, a significant Super 1000 tournament which was held in March. On 28 April, he won the 2018 Asian Championships which was held in Wuhan, after defeating Chen Long of China in the finals with a score of 21–17, 21–13.

On 5 August, he won the World Championships title in Nanjing, China after beating Shi Yuqi from China in the finals with a score of 21–11, 21–13. He also won 4 BWF World Tour titles: Indonesia Open, Japan Open, Denmark Open and Fuzhou China Open. Momota became the first Japanese men's singles player to occupy the World number 1 in the BWF World ranking in 27 September.

2019 
Momota started the 2019 season by competing at the Malaysia Masters as the first seed, but his pace was stopped by Kenta Nishimoto in the first round. He then reached the final in Indonesia Masters, but losing to Anders Antonsen of Denmark. Momota claimed his first title in 2019, by winning the German Open a Super 300 tournament. In March 2019, he won the All England Open beating Viktor Axelsen from Denmark in the finals in 3 sets with a score of 21–11, 15–21, 21–15, becoming the first Japanese man to win the All England Open title.

In April, Momota won his second Asian Championships title in Wuhan, China beating home favorite Shi Yuqi in three games 12–21, 21–18, 21–8. He also won the Singapore and Japan Open titles. In August, he reclaimed his World Champion title, beating Anders Antonsen 21–9 and 21–3. In doing so, Momota became only the fourth player to win back-to-back titles on a short, all-Chinese list that includes Yang Yang, Lin Dan and Chen Long. After that, he won his first title in China and Korea Opens, also defend his title at Denmark Open and Fuzhou China Open.

Momota closed his stellar 2019 year by winning his 11th title, the World Tour Finals by beating Indonesia's Anthony Sinisuka Ginting 17–21, 21–17, 21–14. Previously in the gala dinner of the same event, he was awarded as the BWF Best Male Player of the Year. He is also nominated as Best Male Athlete by the Association Internationale de la Presse Sportive.

2020 
Momota began the 2020 season as the men's singles world number 1. He competed at the Malaysia Masters as the first seeded, defeated Indian's Kashyap Parupalli and H. S. Prannoy in the first and second round with two straight games, later in the quarter final beating Huang Yuxiang in the rubber games. In the semi final, he dashed the host nation's hopes by bowing Lee Zii Jia with the score of 21–10, 21–19. Despite not being at his physical best, Momota pulled off a good show to beat the 2017 World Champion Viktor Axelsen of Denmark 24–22, 21–11 in the final. He extended his head-to-head record over Axelsen to a whopping 14–1. After winning the Malaysia Masters, Momota was involved in a fatal accident, in which the driver was killed, on the way to the airport. He suffered a broken nose as well as injuries to his lips and face.

2021 
In January, Momota tested positive for COVID-19 prior to travelling to Bangkok. As a result, the entire Japanese team withdrew from the three tournaments scheduled to occur that month in Thailand: the Yonex Thailand Open, Toyota Thailand Open, and World Tour Finals. In March, Momota made a comeback to international competition from injury at the All England Open. Seeded first, he was beaten by Lee Zii Jia of Malaysia in the quarter finals in straight games.

During 2020 Summer Olympics, again playing as top seed, Momota was knocked out in the group stage after losing to the unseeded South Korean Heo Kwang-hee. In September–October, Momota alongside Japanese team competed at the Sudirman Cup in Vantaa, Finland. He helps the team reaching the finals, but Japan was defeated by China 1–3. At the Thomas Cup in Aarhus, Denmark, Momota alongside Japanese team won the bronze medal. The team was defeated by China in the semi-finals with a score of 1–3.

In October, he took part in the Denmark Open and finished in 2nd place to Viktor Axelsen in three games, 22–20, 18–21, and 12–21, in a match lasting an hour and thirty-three minutes.

In November, Momota won his first title since his injury, the Indonesia Masters, defeating Anders Antonsen in straight games (21–17, 21–11) in a seemingly one-sided final.

2022 
Momota had a rough start to the 2022 season. Post injury recovery, besides slipping to number 2 on the world rankings, he has not performed up to his pre-injury level. In the opening season, he participated in three tournaments, the All England Open, German Open and the 2022 Badminton Asia Championships. In the All England Open, he was knocked out in the Quarter-finals by Malaysian Lee Zii Jia with score 7–21, 21–13, 11–21. In the German Open, he was knocked out in the first round by his Japanese compatriot Kenta Nishimoto with a score of 21–23, 9–21 in 2 straight sets. At the Badminton Asia Championships, he was defeated in 3 games in the first round by Indonesian Chico Aura Dwi Wardoyo 21–17, 17–21, 7–21.

In the first round of the Thailand Open, he was eliminated in a tame defeat by Zhao Junpeng, 8–21, 11–21 in 2 straight games.  

At the first round of the Indonesia Open, he was knocked out in the first round by the 13th-ranked Rasmus Gemke from Denmark, 19–21, 21–19, 14–21. After the match, Momota stated that he was "disappointed" because he made so many mistakes and that he "would do much more practice to get a better result for the next tournament".

At the Malaysia Open, Momota made it through to his first final since winning the 2021 Indonesia Masters Super 750 event in November. He had received 2 walkovers, one against Kantaphon Wangcharoen and the other being a walkover due to his opponent, Shesar Hiren Rhustavito retiring mid match due to injury. In the final, Momota was trashed by Olympic champion Viktor Axelsen, losing 4–21, 7–21 in just 34 minutes. After the match, Momota told reporters that Axelsen's "level" was higher than he expected, and that despite the loss, he was "very happy to be back here after all the difficult times" he had been through, adding that he "might be getting closer to the answer" that he was looking for.

In the following week, Momota lost in the round of 16 at the Malaysia Masters to compatriot Kanta Tsuneyama, losing 16–21, 15–21 in 50 minutes.

In late August, playing in his home country, Momota took part in the World Championships as the 2nd seed. He was upset by the unseeded Prannoy H. S. in the round of 32, losing 17–21, 16–21 in straight games.

Achievements

BWF World Championships 
Men's singles

Asian Championships 
Men's singles

BWF World Junior Championships 
Boys' singles

Asian Junior Championships 
Boys' singles

BWF World Tour (15 titles, 6 runners-up) 
The BWF World Tour, which was announced on 19 March 2017 and implemented in 2018, is a series of elite badminton tournaments sanctioned by the Badminton World Federation (BWF). The BWF World Tour is divided into levels of World Tour Finals, Super 1000, Super 750, Super 500, Super 300 (part of the HSBC World Tour), and the BWF Tour Super 100.

Men's singles

BWF Superseries (4 titles) 
The BWF Superseries, which was launched on 14 December 2006 and implemented in 2007, was a series of elite badminton tournaments, sanctioned by the Badminton World Federation (BWF). BWF Superseries levels were Superseries and Superseries Premier. A season of Superseries consisted of twelve tournaments around the world that had been introduced since 2011. Successful players were invited to the Superseries Finals, which were held at the end of each year.

Men's singles

  BWF Superseries Finals tournament
  BWF Superseries Premier tournament
  BWF Superseries tournament

BWF Grand Prix (2 titles, 1 runner-up) 
The BWF Grand Prix had two levels, the Grand Prix and Grand Prix Gold. It was a series of badminton tournaments sanctioned by the Badminton World Federation (BWF) and played between 2007 and 2017.

Men's singles

  BWF Grand Prix Gold tournament
  BWF Grand Prix tournament

BWF International Challenge/Series (7 titles) 
Men's singles

  BWF International Challenge tournament
  BWF International Series tournament

Gambling scandal 
On 7 April 2016, Momota admitted visiting an illegal casino in Tokyo after casino staff reported him gambling there "frequently". In a board meeting, it was revealed that he gambled away 0.5 million yen during 6 visits to the casino with his teammate, Kenichi Tago, who spent 10 million yen after 60 visits to various casinos. The Nippon Badminton Association secretary general Kinji Zeniya said it would “probably be impossible” for Momota to participate in the Rio 2016 Olympics, with frequent gambling being punishable by law with a prison sentence of up to 3 years. He was banned from playing until late 2017 for this.

Career overview

Performance timeline

National team 
 Junior level

 Senior level

Individual competitions

Junior level 
 Boys' singles

 Boys' doubles

 Mixed doubles

Senior level

Record against selected opponents 
Record against year-end Finals finalists, World Championships semi-finalists, and Olympic quarter-finalists. Accurate as of 5 November 2022.

References 

1994 births
Living people
People from Mitoyo, Kagawa
Sportspeople from Kagawa Prefecture
Japanese male badminton players
Badminton players at the 2020 Summer Olympics
Olympic badminton players of Japan
Badminton players at the 2014 Asian Games
Badminton players at the 2018 Asian Games
Asian Games bronze medalists for Japan
Asian Games medalists in badminton
Medalists at the 2018 Asian Games
World No. 1 badminton players
BWF Best Male Player of the Year